Dalaca is a genus of moths of the family Hepialidae. There are 23 described species found throughout South America as far north as Panama. The larvae feed on grasses.

Species
Dalaca chilensis - Chile
Dalaca chiriquensis - Panama
Dalaca cocama - Peru
Dalaca crocatus - Chile
Dalaca cuprifera - Peru
Dalaca guarani - Brazil
Dalaca katharinae - Brazil
Dalaca laminata - Chile
Dalaca manoa - Colombia
Dalaca mummia - Brazil
Dalaca niepelti - Ecuador
Dalaca nigricornis - Chile
Dalaca obliquestrigata - Peru
Dalaca pallens - Chile
Dalaca parafuscus - Chile
Dalaca patriciae - Argentina
Dalaca perkeo - Colombia
Dalaca postvariabilis - Argentina
Dalaca quadricornis - Argentina
Dalaca stigmatica - Paraguay
Dalaca usaque - Colombia
Dalaca variabilis - Chile
Dalaca vibicata - Ecuador

Former species
Dalaca tapuja

External links
Hepialidae genera

Hepialidae
Exoporia genera
Taxa named by Francis Walker (entomologist)